The Ahousaht First Nation is a First Nation government based on the west coast of Vancouver Island in British Columbia, Canada. It administers the community of Ahousaht, British Columbia, which encompasses much of Clayoquot Sound. The Ahousaht are a member of the Nuu-chah-nulth Tribal Council. It is led by Chief A-in-chut (meaning 'everyone depends on you') Shawn Atleo and the Taayi Haw̓ił - Maquinna (Lewis George).

Ahousaht has about 1800 members, and about 36% live in Marktosis Indian Reserve No. 15 on Flores Island. ("Marktosis" is an English transliteration of Maaqtusiis, the name of the reserve in the Nuu-chah-nulth language). The Ahousaht Nation is the most populous First Nation on the west coast of Vancouver Island.

Introduction 

The Ahousaht First Nation is the largest among the Nuu-chah-nulth Nation. The Nation is a confederation of multiple former tribes: the Ahousaht (ʕaaḥuusʔatḥ), Manhousaht (Maan̓uusʔatḥ), Kelthsmaht (qiłcmaʔatḥ), Piniit-thlaht (Paniiƛʔatḥ), Qwatswiaht (Qʷaacwiiʔatḥ), O-inmitisaht (Ḥuuʔinmitisʔatḥ), and Otsosaht (ʕuc̓uusʔahtḥ).  These tribes began to join as a confederation before the arrival of the Europeans to their respective shores. Andrew Paul is The cheif of ahousaht 

Ahousaht is named after the village of Ahous (ʕaaḥuus) on the west side of Vargas Island, with the people of ʕaaḥuusʔatḥ being called the "People with their backs to the mountains and land". The Nation's territory encompasses much of Clayoquot Sound. Some 36 percent of Ahousaht members live at Marktosis Indian Reserve (IR # 15), located on Flores Island north of Tofino.  Marktosis has a large community hall, a gym, a youth center, a restaurant, a health center, and a school for children K-12.  Recently, work has begun to expand the elementary/high school to better meet the needs of the students and the community.

Ahousaht's population of approximately 1900 people has been growing at an average rate of 2.6% per year; it is projected to increase to 3125 by 2024. Seventy-seven percent of members are under 40 years of age and 41 percent are under 19 years.

Marktosis is the only one of 25 Ahousaht reserves that is occupied year-round. Others are traditional fishing stations and areas of seasonal resource extraction. They are not habitable for year-round settlement. Many of these historic reserves, designated by the government of the day, tended to mark the general areas that were inhabited by the various members of the nation at the time of contact.  It was only after contact and other changes that many Ahousaht members came to live on I.R 15 (Marktosis).  All Ahousaht reserves are accessible only by boat or floatplane. The Nation reports that many members living "away from home" have a strong interest in returning to their traditional territory if housing and employment were available.

The land reserves of the Ahousaht, and of neighboring coastal nations, are relatively small in size compared to the size of the population.  They believe that the reserve designations may have been small because members of the Ahousaht nation, at the time of contact, did not occupy extensive territory on land. They relied strongly on oceanic resources as their main staple of dietary and other needs.  The ocean was considered to be "the garden" of the people; hence, colonial authorities may have assumed that the people needed little land-base to supply their longterm needs. 

The Ahousaht is known for is its rich tradition of song and dance.  The young men, led by Joseph George Sr., offer a thunderous voice for the nation when performing their art.  A new group, the Soulshakers, has become widely known for not only continuing to share this history of song, but also for composing new and exciting songs/dances to share with family, friends and outsiders in the audience.

Hereditary system 
The role of the Haw̓iiḥ (Hereditary Chiefs) in the Ahousaht governing system is to look after their Ḥahuułi (territory and resources). The  Ahousaht people have maintained their reliance of the Haw̓iiḥ. Under the Haw̓iiḥ system, laws outline chieftainships and governance. The keepers of these laws are the Witwaak. 

No Haw̓ił (Hereditary Chief) is considered above the law. Every Hereditary Chief has advisors so that no Chief makes totally independent decision. His Council (not the elected council, per se; rather, the people who are advisors to the chief) is depended upon for good, solid advice, before he makes any decision for Ahousaht. No Haw̓ił speaks for himself, unless he has good news, or something good to share. All Haw̓iiḥ have speakers or spokesmen, who are trained from an early age for these duties. Speakers must be fluent in Nuu-chah-nultha and have a very strong knowledge of the history of the Haw̓iił seat (including lineage) and his ḥaḥuułi. 

Some analysts have described the Haw̓iiḥ system as being similar to fiefdoms, but the Ahousaht describe it as a more inter-connected system of governance, with numerous accountability mechanisms. No Ha’wiith can hold tremendous power without the support of numerous people who are the bearers of customary laws.

Each Haw̓ił holds a Ḥaḥuułi that includes land, sea, resources and people within his territory. This had clearly defined boundaries, and people who watched over the boundaries between indigenous nations. The Ahousaht have stories in our history that emphasize the importance of the boundaries are and how they were protected.

Haw̓iiḥ have the power to create t̓iquwił, a Seat. (It is a distinction related to historic "nobles" in European history.)  The chief may grant a person a smaller portion of the territory, to own and care for, in return for great service to the nation and the chief.)  Our history tells of two, which were created by our Haw̓iiḥ to recognize the constant support provided by these two individuals. Their importance was such that, at a potlatch, they were recognized before the Haw̓ił when a Haw̓iiḥ dance was performed.

The Ahousaht have oral history, which goes back 17 or 18 generations, of all of our Haw̓iiḥ. It tells of when one hereditary position became three. Each Haw̓ił heads up a "house" and each "house" has a name. Maquinna is the Tyee (the head-ranked Haw̓ił of Ahousaht). 

As a collective, the three Haw̓iiḥ comprise the principal Hereditary Chiefs of Ahousaht. Currently these individuals are:

 Mukʷina: Lewis George
 ƛakišwaya: JJ Keitlah
 Ah-in-chut: Shawn Atleo - Recently Shawn has been given the secondary name A-aap wa-iik in a formal ceremony to mark his new position as leader of the Assembly of First Nations.
Ha’wiih of the four tribes that amalgamated with Ahousaht: Kelthsmaht – Vargas Island, Manhousaht, Qwatswiaht, and Oo-in-mitis, continue to be recognized as principal Hawiih. These individuals are:

For Kelthsmat: Hanuukʷii (Nate Charlie)
For Manhousaht: ʔuuʔkʷaʔqum (James Swan)
For Qwatswiaht: Tupmuuł (Ron George)

The Oo-in-mitis seat is currently vacant.

A person is also appointed to the official role of welcoming visitors. Hi-yupin-ulth (Bill Keitlah, Jr.) currently serves that role as a Ha’ilth for the Ahousaht. Keitlah Jr. acquired the seat from his father, Bill Keitlah, Sr., in 2004. 

In the case of Kelthsmaht, the beach keeper (welcoming person) was appointed or had a t̓iquwił. He is Kanupiit (Rocky Titian).

The Ahousaht Taayii haw̓ił , Maquinna (Lewis George), inherited the seat from his late father, Earl George. Earl George first passed the seat to his eldest son, Uu-qua-qruum (Corbett George). When Uu-qua-qruum (Corbett George) encountered some difficulty in his life, Earl George took the seat back. Just prior to his passing, he named Maquinna (Lewis George) as his successor at Hupacasath. In November 2007, Maquinna (Lewis George) held a major potlatch to declare his seat. 

Ah-in-chut (Shawn Atleo) acquired his seat from his father Ooh-meek (Dr. Richard Atleo). Ah-in-chut (Shawn Atleo) became the British Columbia Regional Chief of the Assembly of First Nations. More recently, he was elected as the overall leader of the Assembly of First Nations.

Elected system 
In addition to the governing body through the Hawiih, Ahousaht has a mandated body of elected officials.  This is the Ahousaht Chief and Council.  The number of councillors is determined by the overall size of the population.  For every 100 members of a nation, there is to be elected one council member, to a maximum of 12 members (as per the Indian Act.)  The elected Council's role is to fulfill requirements of the Indian Act. Overall, both Ha’wiih and Chief and Council represent the Ahousaht membership and honour our long history.

As changes were made in governing in the early 1950s, Ahousaht's first Council was appointed by the Ha’wiih rather than elected by the membership. The late Paul Sam, (Stanley Sam's father), was the first Chief Councillor. The Ahousaht adopted the elected representative system, as required by the Indian Act. 

The Councillors and our Chief Councillor were usually elected on two-year terms; however, due to a court decision (Courbier decision) this has caused changes to be made, and Ahousaht are adopting a new process for holding elections.  One significant change will be the change from two to four-year terms for councillors. Another important change is the expansion of the franchise to include all members of the nation.  Previously, only those members living 'on-reserve' (I.R15 - Marktosis reserve) were allowed to participate as voters. 

The Council is responsible for appointments to other boards on behalf of the Ha’wiih.

Administration 
The Ahousaht have a dynamic administrative group working on all facets of Ahousaht cultural, health, economic, and treaty-related issues. Ahousaht invites you to contact individuals who may act as a gateway to our community on specific projects.  
The Ahousaht First Nation government employs approximately 35 people. Its departments include administration, education, human services, medical clinic, social services, home care, Ahousaht grocery store, transportation, maintenance, fisheries and forestry.

Business and economic development 
The main economic activities in the Ahousaht community are tourism, finfish aquaculture, forestry and fishing (including shellfish). The latter two have declined in recent years. Members are employed seasonally in silviculture, water taxi transport, construction, tourism, forestry and aquaculture. There are five enterprises operated by Ahousaht Administration, including natural resources, tourism, grocery and transport ventures, as well as a minimum of 13 to 15 Ahousaht member-owned businesses in the region. These include restaurants, a gallery, tour companies, water taxis, contractors and professional services.

A protocol agreement signed in 2002 with Pacific National Aquaculture (now Mainstream Canada) provides access to Ahousaht traditional marine territory for the siting of salmon farms in exchange for employment opportunities, tenure fees and environmental monitoring and management improvements. Opportunities for farming indigenous species (e.g., Chinook) are being examined. The aquaculture industry provides 60 to 70 jobs annually for the Nation.  A very important note of merit goes to Albert Frank Sr. of Ahousaht.  In 2009, he became the top performer for all of Mainstream's operations (in fish husbandry) worldwide, raising the bar and proving the worth of local knowledge in finfish aquaculture operations.

One Contracting company, Cover Creek Enterprises, is privately owned by members of Ahousaht and currently employs approximately ten Ahousaht members through contracts with Iisaak Forest Resources. Iisaak Forest Resources (IFR) is a forestry company purchased in recent years by a group of nations in the Clayoquot Sound area.  Formerly, they were known as the 'Central Region Group' of first nations; however, the structure of the Nuu-chah-nulth has changed from the three regional groups into one large group again.  Government transfers make up 24 percent of total income for persons 15 years and over (contrasted against 13 percent in Ucluelet and eight percent in Tofino).

In 2003-04 Weyerhauser transferred two parcels of land adjacent to the existing reserve for community expansion. Plans are underway for a five-year development on District Lot 363 and 363A. The new development is designed to include approximately 200 new homes, an artist's village, cultural centre, new high school and economic development facilities.

Ahousaht is always in talks with Business groups, government, and other individuals to seek out every possible economic venture that they can.  Greg Louie (Chief Councillor) is a good person to contact about such opportunities.

Community opportunities 
Despite census figures of 13 to 14 percent unemployment, locals report much higher rates. Chronically high unemployment and the large young population about to or recently entered into the workforce create significant pressure for job creation, education and training. Of residents 15 years and over 19 percent have less than a Grade 9 education, 56 percent Grade 9–13, 19 percent trade or other non-university and 6 percent university. Social and health issues continue to provide significant challenges for this remote community and impact work-readiness.
There are also several problems with community infrastructure. Housing shortage is a significant issue and a recent study indicated there are 136 dwellings in moderate to poor condition. Further, almost half of the existing reserve (I.R15) is inaccessible to housing or other social development due to poor initial planning of the infrastructure layout.  The community's dumpsite is just above the middle marker of the reserve, and makes expansion of housing into the northern portion of the reserve impossible (due to health and safety regulations).  Solid and sewage waste management is insufficient and the power supply via underwater lines is projected to last for another five to ten years.

Recently, Ahousaht challenged the ownership of land by the Catholic Church to the land that had housed Kakawis Family Development Centre.  This land had served as a treatment centre for many people, including members of Ahousaht; now, however, it is no longer used for such work.  As such, the Ahousaht do not wish to see this land transferred into other private hands, as this land was never seceded to the church, or to the government. Video of Ahousaht hereditary chiefs, reclaiming Kakawis.

See also
Ahousat, British Columbia
Nuu-chah-nulth
Nuu-chah-nulth language

References 

Ecotrust Canada. Cliff Atleo Sr., "The Ahousaht First Nation," in Daniel Arbour, Brenda Kuecks & Danielle Edwards (editors).  Nuu-chah-nulth Central Region First Nations Governance Structures 2007/2008, Vancouver, September 2008.

External links
Ahousaht First Nation
Nuu-chah-nulth Tribal Council

Nuu-chah-nulth governments
Clayoquot Sound region